Uncle and the Battle for Badgertown (1973) is a children's novel written by J. P. Martin, the last of his Uncle series of six books. It was illustrated, like the others in the series, by Quentin Blake.

References

1973 British novels
1973 children's books
British children's novels
Children's fantasy novels
Books about elephants
Jonathan Cape books